Jack Rudin (June 28, 1924 – December 4, 2016) was a New York City real estate developer and a son of real estate developer Samuel Rudin.

Background
Rudin was born to a Jewish family in New York City in 1924, the son of May (née Cohen) and Samuel Rudin. His birth name was Jacob Rudin; he later legally changed his name to Jack. He attended P.S. 166, DeWitt Clinton High School, and then attended City College of New York. In 1942, he served in the United States Army as a Staff Sergeant under General George Patton in the Infantry and received the Bronze Star Medal for fighting in the Battle of the Bulge. In 1945, he returned to the United States and entered the family business. In the 1950s and 1960s, the Rudin family was one of the most prolific builders of skyscrapers in Manhattan. In 1975, Jack and his brother Lewis, took over the family company. Jack focused on construction and operations while Lewis focused on financing and marketing. In 1990, the Rudin Management portfolio was valued at $1.5 billion. He served as Chairman of the Rudin Management Company.

Philanthropy
Rudin served on the Boards of Memorial Sloan-Kettering Cancer Center and Jazz at Lincoln Center. He was an Honorary Trustee of the American Museum of Natural History and Congregation Shearith Israel, and previously served as a trustee at Iona College. In 2003, he was awarded the Chevalier of the French Legion of Honor; and in 2008 was granted the Benemerenti Award Medal by Pope Benedict XVI. Rudin was the primary sponsor of the Va'ad Gemilut Hasadim: Susan and Jack Rudin Center for Community Outreach.

Personal life
In 1951, he married Roberta Chait; she died in 1983. They had three children: Eric Rudin, Madeleine Rudin, and Katherine Rudin. He was remarried to Susan Salesky Schaenen with whom he had two stepdaughters, Inda Schaenen and Eve Schaenen. Rudin died on December 4, 2016 in New York City. Rudin was a member of the Congregation Shearith Israel on the Upper West Side of Manhattan.

References

1924 births
2016 deaths
Jewish American military personnel
American real estate businesspeople
Rudin family
Businesspeople from New York City
Military personnel from New York City
City College of New York alumni
Jewish American philanthropists
DeWitt Clinton High School alumni
Philanthropists from New York (state)
Recipients of the Benemerenti medal
United States Army personnel of World War II